The 2022 Northern Mariana gubernatorial election took place on November 8, 2022 to elect the governor of the Northern Mariana Islands and the lieutenant governor of the Northern Mariana Islands to a four-year term in office. Because no candidate received 50% of the vote in the general election, the two highest-placing candidates advanced to a runoff election on November 25, 2022.

Incumbent Republican Governor Ralph Torres ran for re-election to a second full term in office with territorial senator Vinnie Sablan as his running mate. Lieutenant Governor Arnold Palacios, a career Republican, also contested the seat, running as an independent with Saipan mayor David Apatang as his running mate. Democratic nominee Tina Sablan, a member of the Northern Mariana Islands House of Representatives, is the first woman to be nominated for Governor of the Northern Mariana Islands. She chose fellow territorial representative Leila Staffler as her running mate.

In the general election, Torres came in first with 38.8% of the vote, followed by Palacios at 32.2% and Sablan at 28.0%. Because no candidate received more than 50% of the vote, a runoff between Torres and Palacios was held on November 25, 2022. Sablan and Staffler endorsed Palacios in the runoff, and Palacios and Apatang signed a "unity pledge" with them promising action on several policy issues, including health care, labor, and infrastructure.

Palacios and Apatang won the runoff election with 54% of the vote to 46% for Torres and Sablan. Palacios was the first independent elected Governor of the Northern Mariana Islands and the first independent to win a gubernatorial election in any U.S. state or territory since 2014.

Background 
Torres has been under investigation for misusing public funds since 2019. On January 12, 2022, the Northern Mariana Islands House of Representatives voted to impeach Torres on charges of theft and corruption. A two-thirds majority vote in the Northern Mariana Islands Senate was required to remove the governor from office. The Senate acquitted Torres on May 18 in a 3–4 party-line vote with two senators absent. However, Torres still faced criminal charges brought against him by Attorney General Edward Manibusan. His trial was set for July 5, 2022, but was delayed several times and will not take place until after the November election. Manibusan was reelected in the 2022 election.

Candidates

Republican Party

Declared 
 Ralph Torres, incumbent governor
Running mate: Vinnie Sablan, floor leader of the Northern Mariana Islands Senate

Declined 
Arnold Palacios, Lieutenant Governor of the Northern Mariana Islands (running as an independent)

Democratic Party

Declared 
Tina Sablan, territorial representative (endorsed by party)
Running mate: Leila Staffler, territorial representative

Declined 
 Edith Deleon Guerrero, territorial senator

Independents 
On October 22, 2021, Palacios and Apatang announced they were leaving the Republican Party and would run as an Independent ticket.

Declared 
 Arnold Palacios, Lieutenant Governor of the Northern Mariana Islands
Running mate: David Apatang, mayor of Saipan and former territorial representative

Declined 
Gregorio Sablan, Delegate to the U.S. House of Representatives (running for re-election, endorsed Tina Sablan)

Endorsements

Results

Notes

References

2022 Northern Mariana Islands elections
Northern Mariana Islands
2022 in the Northern Mariana Islands